Schrödinger's Kittens and the Search for Reality  is a 1995 book by John Gribbin, in which the author attempts to explain the mysteries of modern quantum mechanics in a popular-scientific way. It is a sequel to his earlier book, In Search of Schrödinger's Cat (1984).

In his epilogue, Gribbin touches on what were then the most recent developments of string theory, and introduces the transactional interpretation of quantum mechanics as the new "mythology" of our time.  His argument does not refute the theory, but demonstrates how all theories can be true and mythological (depending on one's perspective).

1995 non-fiction books
Books by John Gribbin
English-language books
Popular physics books
Kittens and the Search for Reality